Group D of the 2004 Fed Cup Europe/Africa Zone Group I was one of four pools in the Europe/Africa Zone Group I of the 2004 Fed Cup. Three teams competed in a round robin competition, with the top two teams advancing to the advancement play-offs and the bottom team being relegated down to the relegation play-offs.

Bulgaria vs. Estonia

Poland vs. Greece

Bulgaria vs. Greece

Estonia vs. Poland

Bulgaria vs. Poland

Estonia vs. Greece

See also
Fed Cup structure

References

External links
 Fed Cup website

2004 Fed Cup Europe/Africa Zone